Ea Rasmussen (born 11 March 2001) is a Danish footballer who plays as a midfielder for KoldingQ in the Elitedivisionen and has appeared for the Denmark women's national under-19 football team.

Club career
She has played for the Danish top-level club KoldingQ in the Elitedivisionen, since 2018. She has previously played for FC Horsens's women's team on youth level her whole youth career, until she moved to KoldingQ in 2017, to play for the junior team.

Personal life
Rasmussen supports Liverpool and idolises Steven Gerrard. She has travelled with her family to England in the autumn to watch Liverpool play. Rasmussen went to BGI akademiet in Hornsyld.

References

External links
Profile at Danish Football Association 
 
 
 

2001 births
Living people
Danish women's footballers
Denmark women's international footballers
Women's association football midfielders
People from Horsens
Sportspeople from the Central Denmark Region